Dora the Explorer is an American media franchise centered on an eponymous animated interactive fourth wall children's television series created by Chris Gifford, Valerie Walsh Valdes and Eric Weiner, produced by Nickelodeon Animation Studio and originally ran on Nickelodeon from August 14, 2000 to June 5, 2014, with the final six unaired episodes later airing from July 7 to August 9, 2019. It has since spawned a spin-off television series (Go, Diego, Go!), a sequel television series (Dora and Friends: Into the City!) and a live-action feature film. 

Before rebranding to Paramount Global, the corporation previously named ViacomCBS announced a revival of the Dora the Explorer brand 3 years after its last production, which includes a preschool-aimed CGI animated TV series, and a tween-aimed live-action series, both of which are scheduled for distribution on Paramount+.

Origins

The franchise has its roots from the television show of the same name which centers around Dora Marquez, a seven-year-old Latina girl, with a love of embarking on quests related to an activity that she wants to partake of or a place that she wants to go to, accompanied by her talking purple backpack and anthropomorphic monkey companion named Boots (named for his beloved pair of red boots). Each episode is based around a series of cyclical events that occur along the way during Dora's travels, along with obstacles that she and Boots are forced to overcome or puzzles that they have to solve (with "assistance" from the viewing audience) relating to riddles, the Spanish language, or counting. Common rituals may involve Dora's encounters with Swiper, a bipedal, anthropomorphic masked thieving fox whose theft of the possessions of others must be prevented through fourth wall-breaking interaction with the viewer. To stop Swiper, Dora must say "Swiper no swiping" three times. However, on occasions where Swiper steals the belongings of other people, the viewer is presented with the challenge of helping Boots and Dora locate the stolen items. Another obstacle involves encounters with another one of the program's antagonists; the "Grumpy Old Troll" dwelling beneath a bridge that Dora and Boots must cross, who challenges them with a riddle that needs to be solved with the viewer's help before permitting them to pass. Known for the constant breaking of the fourth-wall depicted in every episode, the audience is usually presented to two primary landmarks that must be passed before Dora can reach her destination, normally being challenged with games or puzzles along the way. The episode always ends with Dora successfully reaching the locale, singing the "We Did It!" song with Boots in triumph.

Premise
The eponymous series focuses on the adventures of a Latina girl named Dora and her monkey friend Boots, with a particular emphasis on the Spanish language. The show is presented in the style of both an interactive CD-ROM game and a point-and-click adventure game, with gimmicks such as title cards appearing in windows and Dora asking the viewer to help her by showing the current items in her inventory and asking the viewer which one is best for the current scenario.

Development
Development of the show came out of Nickelodeon's desire to "come up with the next big hit" similar to its other hit preschool shows at the time; Little Bear and Blue's Clues. The creators sought to combine of the format both shows, with the narrative focus of Little Bear combined with the interactivity of Blue's Clues. The creators further developed the concept by observing  preschoolers with the creators coming to the conclusion that "they are little explorers."

Dora is a Latina. According to a Nickelodeon spokesman, "she was developed to be pan-Latina to represent the diversity of Latino cultures". Initially the character was not planned to be Latina although after an executive at Nickelodeon attended a conference about the lack of Latino representation, the creators were asked if they could include such elements. At first there was hesitancy, but eventually they realized that they had "a great opportunity" and the character's design remained. Originally, Nickelodeon did not want Swiper, as researchers stated he was, "bad modeling and unsettling to kids". The creators felt strongly about the inclusion of the antagonist as an integral part of the series; he remained in the final show.

On numerous occasions, television specials have been aired for the series in which the usual events of regular episodes are altered, threatened, or replaced. Usually said specials will present Dora with a bigger, more whimsical adventure than usual or with a magical task that must be fulfilled, or perhaps even offer a series of different adventures for Boots and Dora to travel through. They might be presented with an unusual, difficult task (such as assisting Swiper in his attempts to be erased from Santa Claus's Naughty List) that normally is not featured in average episodes, or challenge Dora with a goal that must be achieved (such as the emancipation of a trapped mermaid). Sometimes, the specials have involved the debut of new characters, such as the birth of Dora's superpowered twin baby siblings and the introduction of the enchanted anthropomorphic stars that accompany Dora on many of her quests.

On March 8, 2009, Mattel and Nickelodeon announced that Dora will receive a tweenage makeover, switching from a young age to a teenage attending middle school. Initially, it was announced that the new look would not be revealed until late 2009, but after a short controversy, the tween Dora was unveiled on March 16, 2009.

On 13 April 2012, a CGI opening sequence was created by Chicago-based Calabash Animation for the seventh season of the series.

Dora's Explorer Girls
In 2009, Mattel and Nickelodeon introduced a preteen version of Dora, with four friends; named Naiya, Kate, Emma and Alana, who call themselves the Explorer Girls and were featured in Dora and Friends.

Episodes

NOTE: The show's run ended on June 5, 2014, with 6 episodes, however, those episodes did not air in the United States until August 9, 2019, with the premiere of Dora and the Lost City of Gold.

Voice cast

 Dora Márquez (aka Dora the Explorer): Kathleen Herles (2000–2007), Caitlin Sanchez (2008–2012), Fátima Ptacek (2012–2019)
 Boots: Harrison Chad (2000–2007), Regan Mizrahi (2008–2013), Koda Gursoy (2013–2019)
 Backpack: Sasha Toro (2000–2007), Alexandria Suarez (2008–2013), Sofia Lopez (2013–2019)
 Isa the Iguana: Ashley Fleming (2000–2007), Lenique Vincent (2008–2012), Skai Jackson (2012–2019)
 Tico the Squirrel: Muhammad Cunningham (2000–2001), Jose Zelaya (2002–2007), Jean Carlos Celi (2008–2012), Oscar Hutarra (2012–2019)
 Benny the Bull: Jake Burbage (2000–2007), Matt Gumley (2008–2012), Aidan Gemme (2012–2019)
 Diego Márquez: Felipe and Andre Dieppa (2003–2004), Gabriel Alvarez (2003-2006), Jake T. Austin (2005–2010), Brandon Zambrano (2011–2012), Jacob Medrano (2012–2019)
 Explorer Stars: Christiana Anbri, Henry Gifford, Katie Gifford, Aisha Shickler, Muhammed Cunningham, Jose Zeleya
 Val the Octopus, Miscalleneous: Elaine Del Valle
 Mrs. Márquez: Eileen Galindo
 Big Red Chicken, Grumpy Old Troll, Pirate Pig, Miscalleneous: Chris Gifford
 Various: K. J. Sanchez 
 Boots' Father, Miscalleneous: Adam Sietz
 Señor Tucán, Miscalleneous: Leslie Valdes
 Map, Swiper, The Fiesta Trio: Marc Weiner

Guest voices
 John Leguizamo - Silly Mail Bird, Pirate Pig (Dora's Pirate Adventure) and Flying Monkeys
 Cheech Marin - King Juan el Bobo
 Ricardo Montalbán - El Encantador
 Esai Morales – Mr. Márquez
 Amy Principe - Little Star, various
 Irwin Reese - Singing Gate
 Antonia Rey - Abuela
 Paul Rodriguez - León the Circus Lion

Guest stars
 Chita Rivera (Dora's Fairytale Adventure, 2004; Dora Saves Fairytale Land, 2015)
 Johnny Weir (Dora's Ice Skating Spectacular, 2013)
 Hilary Duff (Dora's Ice Skating Spectacular, 2013)
 Jewel Kilcher (Dora in Wonderland, 2014)
 Mel Brooks (Dora in Wonderland, 2014)
 Alan Cumming (Dora in Wonderland, 2014)
 Sara Ramirez (Dora in Wonderland, 2014)
 Juanes (Dora Saves Fairytale Land, 2015)

Foreign adaptations

Dora the Explorer has been produced in various other languages worldwide. It facilitates the learning of important foreign language words or phrases (mostly English), interspersed with a local language (e.g. Norwegian, Russian, Hindi or German), with occasional use of Spanish (used in the Irish, Serbian, and Turkish versions) through its simplicity and use of repetition.
 Arabic – The Arabic language version is broadcast on the "Nickelodeon on MBC3" block of MBC 3, and is presented in Arabic-English.
 Cantonese – The Cantonese language version is broadcast in Hong Kong and presented in Cantonese-English.
 Danish – The Danish language version is called Dora – udforskeren and there are commands and expressions in English. It is broadcast on the national public children's channel, DR Ramasjang, and also on Nick Jr. through various pay TV providers.
 Dutch – The Dutch language version broadcasts on Nickelodeon and Nick. Jr, It is presented in Dutch-English. The voice actors are Lottie Hellingman as Dora and Dieter Jansen as Boots.
 French  – The French language version, Dora l'exploratrice, broadcasts on TF1 in France and Télé-Québec in Canada. It is presented in French-English, with Dora and Boots (called Babouche) speaking French and other protagonists speaking and answering in English.
 Filipino – The Filipino language version broadcasts on ABS-CBN and has the same English title "Dora, the Explorer". The characters speak Filipino and some English, Dora teaches English in this version.
 German – The German language version broadcasts on the German branch of Nick. The bilingualism is German-English.
 Greek – The Greek language version is called "Ντόρα η μικρή εξερευνήτρια" (or Dora the Little Explorer). It broadcasts on Nickelodeon and Star Channel. The bilingualism is Greek-English. Dora and Boots (called Botas) speak Greek and other protagonists speak and answer in English.
 Hebrew – The Hebrew language version broadcasts on HOP channel. The bilingualism is Hebrew-English. The series is called מגלים עם דורה (or Megalim Im Dora—English: Discovering with Dora).
 Hindi – In the Hindi language version, Dora and the other characters speak Hindi. It broadcasts on Nickelodeon and Nick Jr. Dora teaches the viewers English words and numbers.
 Hungarian – In the Hungarian language version, Dora and the other characters speak Hungarian with some English words or phrases. It broadcasts on Nickelodeon. The series is called Dóra a felfedező.
 Indonesian – The Indonesian language version broadcasts on Global TV. The bilingualism is Indonesian-English.
 Irish – The Irish language version broadcasts on the Irish station TG4. The bilingualism is Irish-Spanish with Dora and Boots speaking in Irish and some other characters speaking Spanish as in the original American version.
 Italian – The Italian language version broadcasts on Cartoonito and on Nickelodeon. The bilingualism is Italian-English. The series is called Dora l'esploratrice ("Dora the Explorer"). Most characters speak Italian, but some characters and especially Dora's parents and backpack speak English along with Italian.
 Japanese – The Japanese language version broadcasts on Nickelodeon. The bilingualism is Japanese-English, with Dora and Boots speaking Japanese and other protagonists speaking and answering in English. The version is called ドーラといっしょに大冒険 (Dōra to issho ni dai bōken/Adventures with Dora).
 Kannada – The Kannada language version broadcasts on Chintu TV and is a very popular program on that network. Hindi is the second language in this version.
 Korean – The Korean language version broadcasts on Nick Jr. in Korea. The title is Hi Dora and is introduced by a real person whose name is Dami – she introduces key English vocabulary for each episode. The episode is primarily in Korean with some English.
 Macedonian – The Macedonian language version broadcasts on MRT 1 in Macedonia. The title is "Дора истражува" (or Dora the Explorer). The bilingualism is Macedonian-English.
 Malay – The Malay language version broadcasts on TV9. The bilingualism is Malay-English. Dora speaks primarily in Malay, and the secondary language is English. The original English-Spanish version, however, is also available on Nickelodeon via the Nick Jr. programming slot to subscribers of the ASTRO satellite TV service.
 Malayalam – The Malayalam language version is called Dorayude Prayanam ("Dora's Journey") and broadcasts on Kochu TV, Sun TV Network.
 Mandarin – In the Mandarin Chinese language version Dora the characters speak mainly Mandarin with limited English. It broadcasts on Yo-yo TV in Taiwan (Channel 25).
 Maori – The Māori language version is called "Dora Mātātoa".
 Norwegian – In the Norwegian language version, the bilingualism is Norwegian-English.
 Polish – The Polish language version broadcasts on Nickelodeon in Poland. The bilingualism is Polish-English. The series is called Dora poznaje świat ("Dora explores the world").
 Portuguese – In the Portuguese language versions, Dora a Exploradora broadcasts on RTP2 and Nickelodeon. On Nickelodeon Brazil and TV Cultura, the show is called Dora a Aventureira, and Dora and Boots (called Boots in the Portuguese version and Botas in the Brazilian version) speak Portuguese, while the other protagonists speak and answer in English. Some Portuguese episodes are available on DVD.
 Russian – The Russian language version broadcasts on TNT and Nickelodeon. The bilingualism is Russian-English. The series is called Dasha-sledopyt ("Dasha the Pathfinder"). Dasha is the children's name of Daria (Darya).
 Serbian – The Serbian language version broadcasts on B92. The bilingualism is Serbian-Spanish. The series is called Dora istražuje (Dora is exploring).
 Spanish – There are different Spanish versions for Mexico, Latin America and Spain. Dora la Exploradora broadcasts on Nickelodeon in Latin America. For Hispanic and Latino Americans, it aired on Telemundo until September 2006 and on Univisión since April 2008. Dora and Boots (called Botas) speak Spanish and the other protagonists speak and answer in English. Some Spanish episodes are available to US viewers on VHS, and some DVDs have a Spanish track (including Dora's Egg Hunt). This version is entirely the reverse of the original English version; Tico and  Señor Tucan (called Mr. Toucan) only speak English. Additionally, Univision has added on-screen captions of the Spanish words spoken in English. In Spain, Dora la exploradora is aired on TVE 1, Clan TVE and the Spanish and Portuguese Nickelodeon feed. It is another reverse of the original English version (the characters speak mainly Spanish but there are commands and expressions in English).
 Swedish – In the Swedish language version Dora- utforskaren the characters speak mainly Swedish but there are commands and expressions in English. It broadcasts on Nickelodeon and TV4.
 Tamil – In the Tamil language version Doravin Payanangal (டோராவின் பயணங்கள்), the characters all speak Tamil, with some English interspersed. It broadcasts on a local kids programming channel Chutti TV.
 Thai – In the Thai language version ดอร่าดิเอกซ์พลอเรอร์ or ดอร่าสาวน้อยนักผจญภัย, the characters speak Thai; however, Tico speaks English. It broadcasts on Gang Cartoon Channel, Nick Jr., Thai PBS.
 Turkish – In the Turkish language version Dora the characters speak mainly Turkish, Spanish, and English but there are commands and expressions in Turkish. It broadcasts on Nickelodeon and CNBC-e.

As shown in the list above, Spanish is the second language taught in the original English language version of the show (also broadcast for Malay speakers), in the Irish, Serbian, and the trilingual Turkish versions, but for other versions of the show, the language being taught is English.

Stage adaptations

Two stage versions of the series toured North America, the first being "City of Lost Toys", and the second being "Dora's Pirate Adventure". Produced by Nickelodeon and LiveNation, these productions featured live actors portraying the roles of Dora and her friends, including Boots, Diego, Isa, and the Fiesta Trio. Many of the characters wore elaborate foam costumes designed to resemble the Dora characters. Each production featured a structure similar to an episode of the television series. City of Lost Toys featured Christina Bianco as Dora while Dora's Pirate Adventure featured Danay Ferrer of the band Innosense in the role of Dora and Frankie Grande as Boots. Both productions featured a version of the popular Gloria Estefan song "Get On Your Feet" as the final number of the show. Both productions were conceived by Chris Gifford, creator of the television show, and directed by Gip Hoppe.

There have been three Dora touring companies. The "City of Lost Toys" company and the "Pirate Adventure" company featured actors and crew that were members of Actor's Equity and IATSE, the respective unions for professional actors and stagehands in the United States. The third company performs a reduced version of "Pirate Adventure" and does not employ union personnel. This production is currently touring North America, and scheduled to travel to the United Kingdom and France.

Merchandise
Many action figures and playsets are available in many markets, along with cosmetics, hygiene products, ride-ons, books, board games, plush dolls, apparel, handbags, play tents, play kitchens, and more. Licensees include Mattel-owned Fisher-Price in the United States and Holland Publishing in the United Kingdom.

Toys
In 2004, Lego released four sets based on the characters of the TV series. These include 7330 Dora's Treasure Island, 7331 Diego's Rescue Truck, 7332 Dora and Boots at Play Park, and 7333 Dora and Diego's Animal Adventure.

In 2007, lead paint used by a contract toy manufacturer in China prompted Mattel to issue recalls for nearly a million toys, many of which featured Sesame Street and Nickelodeon characters - including Dora the Explorer. In response, Nickelodeon stated that they would introduce "third-party monitoring" of all manufacturers of products under its brands.

Books

Dora the Explorer series

 Dora's Backpack
 Little Star
 Happy Mother's Day Mami!
 Meet Diego!
 Dora's Thanksgiving
 Dora Loves Boots
 Dora's Book of Manners
 Dora Goes to School
 Dora's Fairy-Tale Adventure
 Dora's Chilly Day
 Show Me Your Smile!
 Dora's Pirate Adventure
 Big Sister Dora!
 At the Carnival
 Dora's Costume Party!
 Dance to the Rescue
 Dora's Starry Christmas
 Super babies
 The Birthday Dance Party
 Dora's World Adventure
 Dora Climbs Star Mountain
 It's Sharing Day!
 Dora Had a Little Lamb
 Dora Saves Mermaid Kingdom!
 Dora and the Stuck Truck

Ready To Read series – Level 1

 Dora's Picnic
 Follow Those Feet!
 Dora in the Deep Sea
 I Love My Papi!
 Say "Cheese!"
 The Halloween Cat
 Eggs for Everyone!
 Just Like Dora!
 I Love My Mami!
 Puppy Takes a Bath
 Around the World!
 Dora's Sleepover
 Dora Helps Diego!
 Dora's Perfect Pumpkin
 Dora's Mystery of the Missing Shoes

A Lift-the-Flap Story
 Good Night, Dora!: A Lift-the-Flap Story
 Where Is Boots?: A Lift-the-Flap Story
 Let's Play Sports!: A Lift-the-Flap Story
 All Dressed Up!: A Lift-the-Flap Book

Treasury books and collection books
 Dora's Ready-to-Read Adventures
Contains: Dora's picnic, Follow those feet, Dora in the deep sea, I love my Papi!, Say "Cheese"
 Dora's Storytime Collection
Contains: Dora's Backpack, Little Star, Happy Birthday, Mami!, Meet Diego!, Dora Saves the Prince, Dora's Treasure Hunt, Good Night, Dora!
 Dora's Big Book of Stories
Contains: Dora's Book of Manners, Dora Goes to School, Dora's Fairy-Tale Adventure, Dora's Chilly Day, Show Me Your Smile!, Dora's Pirate Adventure, Big Sister Dora!

Sticker books
 Dora's Magic Watering Can

Video games

Video games based on the show were released. In Canada, Cheerios offered free Dora the Explorer the Game CD-ROMs in specially marked packages; however, packages sold in Quebec had only the French version. Dora the Explorer: Barnyard Buddies is the first video game based on the show for the home consoles as it was released for the PlayStation in the U.S. in 2003. It was not released in Europe until 2005 when it was one of the last games released on that platform in that territory as the PlayStation declined in production as well as all production on other PS1 games the following year.

Soundtrack

Audiovisual viewing
Seasons of Dora the Explorer are available on a variety of streaming or direct-purchase video services.

Home videos/Home media

Streaming

Direct purchase

Sequel

In 2013, Nickelodeon announced a development of a sequel to Dora the Explorer titled Dora and Friends: Into the City! and would star Dora as a 10-year-old who goes on city adventures with the Explorer Girls and is accompanied by a male friend named Pablo. The series ran for two seasons and 40 episodes on Nickelodeon from August 8, 2014, to February 5, 2017.

Live-action film adaptation

On October 23, 2017, Paramount Pictures and Nickelodeon Movies announced a development of live-action film adaptation of the franchise at sister studio Paramount Players titled Dora and the Lost City of Gold for a scheduled summer 2019 release. It was filmed in Gold Coast, Queensland, Australia at Village Roadshow Studios and directed by James Bobin from a screenplay by Nicholas Stoller and Kristin Burr as producer. The film was expected to follow the title character as a teenager unlike the TV series with the inclusion of her cousin Diego. On May 2, 2018, Isabela Moner was announced to portray the titular character. The film was released in theaters/cinemas in the U.S. and Canada on August 9, 2019.

Live-action series and animated reboots
On February 24, 2021, Paramount+ announced the development of a live-action series based on the franchise. The following February, whiles announcing the development of a computer-animated reboot series, Paramount+ further clarified that the live-action series would be aimed at tweens and take inspiration from the live-action film, Dora and the Lost City of Gold.

See also

 Go, Diego, Go!
 Dora and Friends: Into the City!
 Dora and the Lost City of Gold

References

External links
 
 

Dora the Explorer
2000 American television series debuts
2000s American animated television series
2010s American animated television series
Mass media franchises introduced in 2000
2000s Nickelodeon original programming
2010s Nickelodeon original programming
2000s preschool education television series
2010s preschool education television series
2019 American television series endings
American children's animated adventure television series
American children's animated fantasy television series
American preschool education television series
Animated preschool education television series
Animated television series about children
CBS original programming
English-language television shows
Hispanic and Latino American television
Nick Jr. original programming
Spanish-language education television programming
Telemundo original programming
Television shows adapted into films
Television shows adapted into plays
Television shows adapted into video games
Univision original programming
Paramount Global franchises
Paramount Media Networks franchises